America Rising is a United States political action committee (PAC) that produces opposition research on Democratic Party members. It has been called the “unofficial research arm of the Republican Party” by the Wall Street Journal.

Organization 
America Rising was founded in March 2013 by Mitt Romney's 2012 presidential campaign manager, Matt Rhoades. Political strategist Tim Miller left the Republican National Committee (RNC) to join the clearinghouse. As of January 2014, between the PAC and the LLC run by fellow opposition research veteran Joe Pounder, the organization employed 47 people, full or part-time. CNN reported that America Rising would be split into two entities: a super PAC that aimed to spread negative stories about congressional Democratic incumbents and candidates through digital channels and earned media, and an LLC that would house a video library to be shared with GOP candidates, the RNC and other right-leaning groups. To avoid making illegal in-kind corporate contributions, the LLC would likely need to charge candidates for access to the library. Pounder and Miller estimated it would have a budget of between $10 and $15 million for the 2013-2014 election cycle.

Raj Shah, appointed to be White House Deputy Assistant to the President and Deputy Director of Communications for Research in the Trump Administration in 2017, was also a co-founder of the PAC. He had been deputy research director at the RNC in 2012 and, from there, ultimately became the head of opposition research at the committee for the 2016 campaign. After 2012, he focused specifically on developing deep anti-Hillary Clinton playbooks for America Rising and the RNC.

America Rising shares its office space and multiple current and former executives with Definers Public Affairs, an opposition research firm, and NTK Network, a digital news aggregator.

2014 Senate races

In the 2014 Iowa senate race, America Rising released a split screen video of Democratic Senate candidate Bruce Braley being readied for a televised appearance alongside a similar video of former U.S. Senator John Edwards. America Rising also released a video of Braley saying of Iowa Senator Chuck Grassley, "you might have a farmer from Iowa who never went to law school, never practiced law, serving as the next chair of the Senate Judiciary Committee."

The campaign of Alaska U.S. Senator Mark Begich's reelection opponent, Dan Sullivan, used the identical opposition research files as did an outside group aligned with it. Their source was America Rising, which has a corporate political research arm that purveys its materials directly to campaigns, but it also sells to outside groups like Crossroads Grassroots Policy Strategies (Crossroads GPS). "Everyone is paying for the same research, information, and then they can use it at their own discretion. Nobody's discussing how they want to deploy that information," said Tim Miller, America Rising's executive director. The Sullivan campaign also employed the same political consulting firm, Black Rock Group, as did the Crossroads GPS sister organization, American Crossroads, a super PAC that had spent more than a million dollars on campaign ads attacking Begich or promoting Sullivan. Operatives Ed Gillespie and Karl Rove co-founded the two latter organizations. One of the partners at Black Rock, Michael Dubke, is a strategist for Sullivan's campaign; another, Carl Forti, is the political director for American Crossroads. Miller and Dubke both contend their firms' arrangements do not violate the law because they each employ different workers on opposite sides of a firewall between the campaigns and the outside groups. Dubke said he works on some projects alongside Forti, but they don't interact on Alaska issues and Forti works out of a separate office for American Crossroads. A spokesman for the Sullivan campaign, Mike Anderson, failed to respond to a request to address how it ensures its vendors avoid violating coordination rules. He wrote: "There are very clear guidelines, and our campaign staff, consultants and vendors strictly adhere to them." The Federal Election Commission (FEC) avoids policing the relationships between outside groups and candidates, failing to bring enforcement, according to Larry Noble, the former general counsel for the FEC from 1987 to 2000. Nobel says the FEC's three Democrats and three Republicans frequently deadlock as they vote on whether or not to initiate investigations. Ann Ravel, the frustrated vice chair of the FEC authored a 2014 New York Times op-ed about the stalemates entitled, "How Not to Enforce Campaign Laws."

Trump administration
America Rising Squared, a non-profit division of America Rising oversaw the targeting of environmental advocates such as Bill McKibben and Tom Steyer by deploying "trackers" to videotape them. Brian Rogers, executive director of America Rising Squared, said that the firm had focused on McKibben and Steyer because they "aggressively target conservative thought leaders."

Doxing issues accusations
In 2018, a Democratic candidate who worked for the US government and filed a mandatory "SF-86" form with sensitive personal information accused the group of using the information publicly as a campaign strategy by Republicans.

In December 2018, the U.S. Postal Service inspector general "officially cleared" America Rising "of any wrongdoing" in obtaining the personnel file of the Democratic candidate. The IG report concluded that the group went through the proper channels and submitted a Freedom of Information Act request for the file to the National Archives and Records Administration (NARA).

References

External links
 America Rising home page

Opposition research
Political organizations based in the United States
Organizations established in 2013